Ireland competed at the 1964 Summer Olympics in Tokyo, Japan. 25 competitors, 24 men and 1 woman, took part in 23 events in 7 sports.

Medalists

Bronze
 Jim McCourt - Boxing, Men's Lightweight

Athletics

Boxing

 Flyweight - John Anthony McCafferty
 Round of 32 - beat Carbonelli (Cuba) 5-0
 Round of 16 - beat Shittu (Ghana) 3-2
 Quarterfinal - lost to Atzori (Italy) 0-5
 Bantamweight - Christopher Rafferty
 Round of 32 - lost to Almarez (Argentina) 0-5
Featherweight - Patrick Fitzsimons
 Round of 32 - lost to Gutman (Poland) 0-5
Lightweight - James McCourt
 Round of 32 - beat Suh (Korea) 4-1
 Round of 16 - beat Sarwar (Pakistan) 4-1
 Quarterfinal - beat Barrera (Spain) 4-1
 Semifinal - lost to Barannikov (USSR) 2-3 (Bronze medal)

Equestrian

Fencing

Two fencers, both men, represented Ireland in 1964.

Men's foil
 Michael Ryan
 John Bouchier-Hayes

Men's épée
 Michael Ryan
 John Bouchier-Hayes

Men's sabre
 Michael Ryan
 John Bouchier-Hayes

Judo

Sailing

Wrestling

References

Nations at the 1964 Summer Olympics
1964
1964 in Irish sport